The 93rd running of the Paris–Roubaix single-day cycling classic, often known as the Hell of the North, was held on 9 April 1995. Italian Franco Ballerini won his first of two victories, finishing two minutes ahead of the pursuing group after a 30 km solo. Andrei Tchmil won the sprint for second place before Johan Museeuw. The race served as the third leg of the 1995 UCI World Cup. 91 of 178 riders finished.

Results
9-04-1995: Compiègne–Roubaix, 266 km.

References

External links
Results by Cyclingbase.com

1995
1995 in road cycling
1995 in French sport
Paris-Roubaix
April 1995 sports events in Europe